Muhammed Saeed Taib (born 1939) is a Saudi Arabian political activist, lawyer, writer, and one of the most prominent liberals in the country. He is best known for his book Prince and Intellectuals 
(مثقفون وأمير: الشورى وسياسة الباب المفتوح) where he stated his liberal views on the political reforms of Saudi Arabia. The book was published in 1992 and was banned in Saudi Arabia. Taib has recently participated in the Saudi Arabian National Debate (الحوار الوطني).

See also
Tuwaa

References

1939 births
Living people
Saudi Arabian writers
Saudi Arabian dissidents
20th-century Saudi Arabian lawyers
People from Mecca
21st-century Saudi Arabian lawyers